The Queensland University of Technology Distinguished Constructor Award  recognises significant contributions by individuals to the Queensland construction industry and community and to honour those who have given a lifetime of work to the industry. The achievements of Queensland's most admired construction industry leaders are further acknowledged by their induction into the QUT Construction Hall of Fame.

History

The award was established in 1998, the initiative of Professor Weilin Chang, the then Dean of the Faculty of Built Environment and Engineering, who saw it as a way to "give something back to industry".

Criteria

Recipients are selected by a panel of their peers, which includes senior academics from QUT and leaders from Queensland's construction industry and Government. There is no external nomination process – the panel brings forward people for consideration based on their extensive knowledge of the construction scene.

The Award

The award itself was designed by the then QUT industrial design lecturer Steve Curran while the original Hall of Fame display was designed by QUT student, Anna Nelson, after winning a design competition. The Award is presented annually at a venue on the Gardens Point campus of the QUT. A Construction Hall of Fame has been created at QUT's Gardens Point campus as a permanent site for the recognition of the endeavours of leaders of the construction industry in Queensland.

Recipients

References

Awards established in 1998
Australian science and technology awards
Queensland University of Technology